Urho Kujala (born 18 May 1957 in Vampula) is a Finnish orienteering competitor. He received a bronze medal in the relay event at the 1978 World Orienteering Championships in Kongsberg, together with Jorma Karvonen, Simo Nurminen and Risto Nuuros.

See also
 List of orienteers
 List of orienteering events

References

1957 births
Living people
Finnish orienteers
Male orienteers
Foot orienteers
World Orienteering Championships medalists